Ohaveth Sholum Congregation (alternate spellings: Ohaveth Shalem, Ohaveth Shalom) was the first synagogue in Seattle, Washington, USA. Described by the Washington State Jewish Historical Society (WSJHS) as "a quasi-Reform temple," it was the Seattle's first Jewish congregation. It fell four days short of having the first synagogue in Washington.

History

The congregation, whose name means "lovers of peace," was established either on July 25, 1889 or August 25, 1889. In either case, that would make it the first Jewish congregation in Seattle. Most of the congregation had immigrated from either Germany or Poland and had already spent several decades in the American West. By now rather assimilated to American ways, they adopted the Reform prayerbook Minhag America, used both English and Hebrew in their services, seated both sexes together, and followed San Francisco's Congregation Emanu-El in using an organ during services. They observed each holiday for a single day, rather than the two days observed by the Orthodox.

Prior to constructing a synagogue, the congregation met at Wickstrom Hall at 8th Avenue and Columbia Street on First Hill. Sigismund Aronson, secretary-treasurer of the prominent Seattle wholesaler Schwabacher Brothers, was congregation president. Other prominent members of the congregation, were Bailey Gatzert, Seattle's first (and, as of 2008, still only) Jewish mayor, also associated with Schwabacher Brothers, and Jacob Furth, a banker and a key figure in the creation of Seattle's infrastructure for water and electricity.

Their synagogue at 8th Avenue and Seneca Street on First Hill was designed by Herman Steinman. It opened on September 18, 1892, four days after Reform Temple Emanu-El in Spokane, making the latter the first synagogue in Washington. The Spokane congregation later merged into Beth Shalom, Spokane.

Ohaveth Sholum Congregation also had a cemetery (established 1889) on Queen Anne Hill. The congregation disbanded 1895 or 1896, and the building was foreclosed upon. The cemetery passed first into the hands of the Seattle Hebrew Benevolent Society and later (in 1910) Temple De Hirsch, later merged into Temple De Hirsch-Sinai.

Notes

References
 .

External links
 Photograph of the synagogue, University of Washington Libraries Digital Collections.

German-American culture in Washington (state)
German-Jewish culture in the United States
Jews and Judaism in Seattle
Polish-American culture in Washington (state)
Polish-Jewish culture in the United States
Religious organizations established in 1889
1895 disestablishments in the United States

1896 disestablishments in the United States
Reform synagogues in Washington (state)
Religious buildings and structures in Seattle
1889 establishments in Washington (state)
Synagogues completed in 1892